Group B of the 1992 Federation Cup Americas Zone was one of four pools in the Americas zone of the 1992 Federation Cup. Four teams competed in a round robin competition, with the top two teams advancing to the knockout stage.

Brazil vs. Ecuador

Puerto Rico vs. Guatemala

Brazil vs. Puerto Rico

Ecuador vs. Guatemala

Brazil vs. Guatemala

Ecuador vs. Puerto Rico

See also
Fed Cup structure

References

External links
 Fed Cup website

1992 Federation Cup Americas Zone